Jajan pasar (Javanese: market snacks) refers to traditional Javanese cakes sold in the Javanese markets.

Etymology 
Jajan in Javanese can mean 1) to buy food; or 2) snacks/food for sale. While pasar means "market". Jajan pasar thus means "snacks/food sold in the market". 

There are different types of snacks sold in the traditional markets in Java: jajan pasar, kue, bolu, and roti. Jajan pasar refers to native Javanese snacks; kue (from Chinese gao; kwe) refers to some western cakes and steamed cakes of Chinese origin; bolu (from Portuguese bolo) refers to sponge cakes and some other types of cake with a similar texture; while roti (from Sanskrit rotika) refers to any baked goods in general.

However, in urban areas, the word "kue" is used to refer to all kinds of food products mentioned above. This happened due to a strong influence of Chinese descents' language use in the areas. More than 90% or Chinese descents in Indonesia (who may not speak fluent Chinese, but would incorporate some Chinese words into their speech) lives in the cities, where Indonesian language is spoken as a lingua franca. The word "kue" was later adopted to the "Great Indonesian Dictionary" (KBBI) to refer to all kinds of snacks, no matter the origins.

The use of kue, instead of jajan pasar, has become increasingly widespread as more suburbs and villages becoming urbanized, blurring the lines between what constitutes as ethnic Javanese food and what's considered peranakan (Chinese-influenced); something that might come across as cultural erasure.

Types of Jajan

 Klepon
 Arem-arem
 Lemper
 Serabi
 Nagasari
 Mendoan
 Jenang
 Gethuk
 Putu mayang

See also

 Kue
 Roti
Kue bolu
 Javanese cuisine
 Javanese diaspora
 Javanese culture

References

 
 
 

Javanese cuisine
Indonesian snack foods